Eucosma ignotana is a species of moth of the family Tortricidae. It is found in China (Inner Mongolia, Sichuan, Shaanxi, Qinghai) and Russia.

References

Moths described in 1916
Eucosmini